The Jonesboro, Lake City and Eastern Railroad (JLC&E) was a short-line railroad that operated in Mississippi and Craighead County of northeast Arkansas.  This railroad received a charter from the State of Arkansas on April 7, 1897, and track construction between Jonesboro and Blytheville began soon thereafter.

History
The initial push to construct the JLC&E came from timber owners and land speculators in northeast Arkansas, all of whom saw the availability of railroad transportation as a necessary ingredient to harvesting timber.  By the time the railroad was completed in the summer of 1901, several large sawmills were either in operation or being built along the tracks.  In early 1911, the JLC&E was purchased by Robert E. Lee Wilson, a prominent landowner who resided in Wilson, Arkansas.

The JLC&E railroad was purchased by the St. Louis–San Francisco Railway (Frisco) in 1925, and operated as a Frisco branch line into the 1970s.  All of the former JLC&E tracks have been dismantled, except for a short segment between Blytheville and Armorel, Arkansas.

Surviving equipment
No. 34 is a 2-6-0 “Mogul” built by Baldwin in 1916 and operated on the JLC&E.  It has  cylinders and  driving wheels.  When the line was sold to the Frisco, the locomotive was renumbered to 73 and  kept by the Frisco until sold on September 19, 1945, to the Delta Valley and Southern Railway.  The engine is preserved on the Lee Wesson Plantation in Victoria, Arkansas under the Delta Valley & Southern Locomotive No. 73 name with no visible numbers on the cab or tender, but with the original Frisco raccoon-skin-shaped number board and “73” on its nose.

No. 40 and No. 41 are 2-8-0 Consolidation-type engines built by the Baldwin Locomotive Works in December 1920 for the JLC&E.  When the line became part of the Frisco, the locomotives were renumbered as 76 and 77.   After performing freight service for years, both engines were sold in 1947 to the Mississippian Railway where they retained the Frisco numbers.  After several further changes in ownership for each, No. 40 is now owned by the B&O Railroad Museum in Oakland, Maryland, where it has been renumbered and relettered as the Baltimore & Ohio 476, and No. 41 is now with Alberta Prairie Railway in Stettler, Alberta, where it pulls excursion trains and has been renumbered back to the original 41.

See also 
 Manila station (Arkansas): JLCER station

References

Dew, Lee A. (1968), The JLC&E, History of an Arkansas Railroad, Arkansas State University Press, Jonesboro, Arkansas.

Defunct Arkansas railroads
Predecessors of the St. Louis–San Francisco Railway
Railway companies established in 1897
Railway companies disestablished in 1950
American companies disestablished in 1950
Transportation in Mississippi County, Arkansas
Transportation in Craighead County, Arkansas